Tentam (1969–1981) was an American Thoroughbred racehorse.

Racing career
Owned by Charles W. Engelhard Jr., who raced him under his Cragwood Stables nom de course, Tentam won Grade 1 races and on August 11, 1973, set a world record for one and one eight miles on turf in winning the Bernard Baruch Handicap at Saratoga Race Course.  He was then sold for $2 million in September to E. P. Taylor whose Windfields Farm owned the supersire Northern Dancer. E. P. Taylor purchased Tentam, a descendant of Man o' War, for breeding purposes but raced him for the remainder of 1973 before syndicating him and sending him to stand at his stud farm.

Stud record
Tentham met with reasonable success as a sire. Some of the best known among his progeny were Ten Gold Pots, the 1985 
Sovereign Award for Canadian Champion Older Horse, and the filly, La Voyageuse, winner of three Canadian Sovereign Awards.

References
 Tentam's pedigree and partial racing stats
 September 21, 1973 New York Times article on the sale of Tentam to E. P. Taylor

1969 racehorse births
1981 racehorse deaths
Racehorses bred in Florida
Racehorses trained in the United States
Horse racing track record setters
American Grade 1 Stakes winners
Thoroughbred family 2-f
Godolphin Arabian sire line